Agouni is a village and seat of the commune of Salam in the Cercle of Timbuktu in the Tombouctou Region of Mali.

References

Populated places in Tombouctou Region